The 2002 Sun Belt Conference football season was the 2nd college football season for the Sun Belt Conference. During the 2002 season, seven schools competed in Sun Belt football: Arkansas State, Idaho, Louisiana–Lafayette, Louisiana–Monroe, Middle Tennessee, New Mexico State and North Texas.

The conference title was won by North Texas, in its second year as both a Sun Belt member, making them the first team to go back-to-back in Sun Belt Conference history.

Coaches
Note: Stats shown are before the beginning of the season

Bowl games
In 2002, the SBC placed one team in bowl games through their tie-ins: North Texas. New Mexico State was also bowl-eligible but did not receive a bowl invitation.

Note: All times are local

Players of the Year
2001 Sun Belt Player of the Year awards

References